Walter Pozzebon (born 12 June 1979 in Treviso, Italy) is a rugby union player for Venezia Mestre in the Top12.

Walter Pozzebon's position of choice is as a centre. He used to play for Bristol in England.

External links
Bristol Rugby profile

1979 births
Living people
Bristol Bears players
Italian rugby union players
Sportspeople from Treviso
21st-century Italian people